Jizi (Gija) allegedly fled the Chinese Shang dynasty to the Korean Peninsula, where he founded the dynastic state of Gija Joseon and eventually succeeded the Dangun as king of Gojoseon. Legend says that Gija brought to the Korean people many skills from China, such as agriculture and weaving; he is also credited with founding the city of Pyongyang.

The site of Gija's burial mound was identified during the Goryeo dynasty by King Sukjong, who constructed the first mausoleum at the 1102. A memorial temple was later added and the mausoleum was enlarged and repaired in 1324 and again in 1355.

In 1570, King Seonjo of the Joseon dynasty erected a monument at the site requiring all people riding past to dismount out of respect. When Korea was under Japanese rule, the site was heavily promoted as a tourist venue by the Japanese, who tempered Korean ethnic nationalism by pointing out that the first "Korean" kingdom was founded by a foreigner.

However, the North Korean government denies Gija's existence as a fabrication of the Chinese Han dynasty historians as a propaganda to justify its rule over the Korean Peninsula, and has neglected and defaced the tomb. The tomb was allegedly excavated in the 1960s, which in turn yielded nothing but broken bricks and pottery. The current state of the tomb is unknown, though it is believed to have been destroyed shortly after its excavation. The site was purposefully excluded from the list of National Treasures of North Korea.

Despite this, it is believed the true tomb of Gija is located in China, in the Cao County.

See also
 Jizi
 Gija Joseon
 Tomb of King Tangun
 Tomb of King Tongmyong
 National Treasures of North Korea

References

 
 On Proper Evaluation and Treatment of the Cultural Heritage of Our Nation with a Correct Viewpoint and Attitude, Talk to the Officials of the Propaganda and Agitation Department of the Central Committee of the Workers' Party of Korea March 4, 1970

Gija Joseon
Buildings and structures in Pyongyang
Archaeological sites in North Korea